The Stratford Community School District is a public school district headquartered in Stratford, Iowa.  The district spans western Hamilton County and eastern Webster County, with a smaller area in Boone County, and serves the town of Stratford and the surrounding rural areas.

Dr. Mandy Ross, superintendent of Webster City Community School District, serves as superintendent.

Schools
The district operates a single elementary school in Stratford:
 Stratford Elementary School

Students from Stratford attend secondary school at Webster City Community School District.

Enrollment

References

External links
 Stratford Community School District

School districts in Iowa
Education in Boone County, Iowa
Education in Webster County, Iowa
Education in Hamilton County, Iowa